Peter Christoph Spuhler (born 9 January 1959) is a Swiss industrialist and politician of the Swiss People's Party, where from 1999 to 2012 he served as a member of the Swiss National Council for the canton of Thurgau. Spuhler was CEO of the family firm Stadler Rail from 1989 to 2017 and from 2020 onwards. As of April 2019, he held a 40% shareholding in Stadler.

Early and Personal life
Peter Spuhler was born in Seville, Spain. After completing his compulsory and tertiary education in Zurich, as well as compulsory military service, he studied business administration at the University of St. Gallen from 1980 to 1986. In his youth he played ice hockey for the Grasshopper Club Zürich.

Spuhler is married to Daniela Spuhler-Hoffmann and has one child with her. He also has two children from a previous marriage. His assets were estimated by the Swiss business magazine Bilanz at 2.25 billion Swiss francs in 2017.

Business career

Stadler Rail 
After marrying into the Stadler family, Spuhler took up his position in 1987 at Stadler Fahrzeuge AG, which was then still managed by Irma Stadler. Two years later, he took over the company with its 18 employees and a turnover of approx. 4.5 million Swiss francs, according to his statement with a bank loan from the Thurgauer Kantonalbank for around 5 million Swiss francs. He restructured it and, with the Stadler GTW, opted for a new vehicle that was more suitable for modern local transport. In order to continue to be successful in rail vehicle construction, Spuhler bought the Werk Altenrhein from Schindler Waggon AG in 1997. The new holding structure favored expansion into Germany and Eastern Europe. On 1 April 2018, Spuhler handed over the management of the Stadler Rail Group to Thomas Ahlburg. Since then, he has concentrated on the Stadler Rail Group as President of the Board of Directors. As of May 2020, due to differences in the strategic and organisational development of Stadler Rail AG, he took over the position of Group CEO ad interim.

Other roles
Spuhler is a member of the board of directors of the Aebi-Schmidt Group and holds other seats on the board of directors of two other companies: Gleisag (Rorschach) and Walo Bertschinger AG (Zurich). Since April 2019, he has been a member of Robert Bosch Industrietreuhand KG and also sits on the supervisory board of Robert Bosch GmbH. He is also a member of the Mittelthurgau Employers' Association in Weinfelden, the IG Freiheit, the Thurgau Chamber of Industry and Commerce (Weinfelden) and the Information Service for Public Transport (Bern). Spuhler is also involved in the Tele D Foundation (Diessenhofen) and is Vice President of the Betriebs AG of the ZSC Lions.

References

External links 
 Personal website
 

1959 births
Living people
Members of the National Council (Switzerland)
Swiss People's Party politicians
University of St. Gallen alumni
Swiss billionaires